Call of Duty: Black Ops – Zombies is a spin-off game of the Call of Duty series' Zombies mode and the sequel to Call of Duty: World at War – Zombies. Developed by Ideaworks Game Studio and published by Activision for the iOS and Android platforms, it was launched in select countries on December 1, 2011.

Overview 
It is the sequel to the popular mode on Call of Duty: World at War, the fifth title in the Call of Duty series. The game allows two- to four-player co-op multiplayer, and, as a new addition to the iOS platform, voice chat and another new feature - to crouch and full prone - a first for all iOS first-person shooters. The first map released was Kino der Toten. Dead Ops Arcade has also been fully transformed to the iOS platform, with 50 levels, and the player is able to select and play as one of the four characters from the console version (Tank Dempsey, Nikolai Belinski, Takeo Masaki and Doctor Edward Richtofen) or as one of the four random characters from Dead Ops Arcade and a "rookie" soldier in the tutorial. Activision has stated that further map packs will be released in the near future, free of charge, and Ascension was listed as coming soon in the map selection, while Call of the Dead's name was seen briefly after that. Both of these maps have been released.

Kino der Toten is much like its console/PC counterparts with the exception that its central stairway has been changed to two ramps that go in two directions and meet back up. All doors, perks, and weapons cost the same number of points as on console/PC.

"Ascension" is also quite similar to its original game play with the addition of space monkeys. Along the return of the three and done pack a punch process, new perks (including Stamin-up and PHD flopper), and new tactical grenades such as the matryoshka dolls later used in "Call of the Dead" and the Gersh devices that later appeared on "Moon" in both Black Ops, Black Ops 3, and under the name of the Krazny device in Cold War zombies.

References 

2011 video games
Android (operating system) games
Activision games
Black Ops - Zombies
IOS games
Video games about zombies
Multiplayer and single-player video games
Video games developed in the United Kingdom
Video games set in Berlin
Video games set in the Soviet Union
Video games set in Kazakhstan
Video games set in Russia